Predrag Bjelac (born 30 June 1962) is a Serbian actor. He portrayed Igor Karkaroff in Harry Potter and the Goblet of Fire and Lord Donnon in The Chronicles of Narnia: Prince Caspian. He is a graduate of the Belgrade University's Faculty of Dramatic Art, class of 1986, and studied at The Lee Strasberg Theatre Institute (1988) in New York City.

Filmography

Film 

Šest dana juna (1985) - Petar
Destroying Angel (1987) - Otto
Poslednja priča (1987, TV Movie) - Vlada
The Fall of Rock and Roll (1989)
Čudna noć (1990)
Stand by (1991) - Veliki
Harrison's Flowers (2000) - Doctor in Vukovar
The Final Victim (2003) - Simons 
Eurotrip (2004) - Italian Guy at Vatican
Kad porastem biću kengur (2004) - Baron
Harry Potter and the Goblet of Fire (2005) - Igor Karkaroff
Amor Fati (2005, Short) - Branko
The Omen (2006) - Vatican Observatory Priest
Ro(c)k podvraťáků (2006) - Chřestýš
The Chronicles of Narnia: Prince Caspian (2007) - Lord Donnon
Ať žijí rytíři! (2009) - Ahmed (Movie cut)
Harry Potter and the Half-Blood Prince (2009) - Igor Karkaroff (uncredited; appears in flashback)
Kao rani mraz (2010) - Stari Nikola
Sasha (2010) - Vlado Petrovic
Czech-Made Man (2011) - Noha 
AS PIK (2012)
Artiljero (2012) - Gane
Ironclad: Battle for Blood (2014) - Maddog
Horseplay (2014) - Gypsy King
Child 44 (2015) - Basurov 
Gangster Ka (2015) - Dardan
DxM (2015) - Mosca
Winnetou & Old Shatterhand (2016) - Tangua
Winnetou - Der letzte Kampf (2016) - Tangua
Intrigo: Dear Agnes (2019) - Caretaker

Television
Warriors (1999) - Naser Zec
The Immortal: Deja vu (2001) - Petr
Children of Dune (2003) - Namri
Spooks (a.k.a. MI-5) (2007) - Edik Kuznetzov
The Fixer (2008) - Tarek Sokoli
Dobrá čtvrť (2008) - Dragan
The Courier 2.0 (2008) - Valentine
Ať žijí rytíři! (2010) - Ahmed
4-teens (2011) - Uncle Dragan
Borgia (2011-2014) - Francesco Piccolomini
Cirkus Bukowsky (2013-2014) - Luka Coltello
Případy 1. oddělení (2014) - Abikal
Genius (2017) - Milos Maric
Killing Eve (2020) - Grigoriy

References

External links
 

1962 births
Living people
Male actors from Belgrade
Serbian male film actors
American people of Serbian descent
University of Belgrade Faculty of Dramatic Arts alumni
20th-century Serbian male actors
21st-century Serbian male actors
Serbian male television actors